Henry Thornton may refer to:

People
 Henry Thornton (reformer) (1760–1815), English economist, banker, philanthropist and parliamentarian; one of the founders of the Clapham Sect
Henry Thornton (MP) for Bridgwater (UK Parliament constituency)
 Sir Henry Worth Thornton (1871–1933), president of Canadian National Railway
 Henry Gerard Thornton (1892–1977), British microbiologist, see Leeuwenhoek Lecture
 Henry Thornton (cricketer) (born 1996), Australian cricketer

Other
 Henry Thornton (magazine), Australian online opinions based magazine established in 1999

See also
Harry Thornton (disambiguation)